QuuxPlayer is a freeware audio player for Windows developed by Matthew Hamilton of Quux Software. It is designed principally for sound quality, simplicity and ease of use. QuuxPlayer can support large music libraries of 100,000 tracks or more, with the ability to load up to 30,000 tracks per minute. It also provides a tag editor, automatic downloads of album details, lyrics and reviews, and support for Internet radio and podcasts. 

QuuxPlayer's download package is small, comprising a total of 1.6Mb including complete functionality. It has no skins, plugins or additional features unrelated to its function as an audio player and music manager.

Core features 
 24-bit output with ASIO support
 Music library management
 Plays all major file formats including MP3, iTunes (AAC and Apple Lossless), OGG Vorbis, Windows Media and FLAC
 Home theater features for visibility and control
 30 / 10 band graphic equalizer
 Clipping warning and prevention
 Chromatic spectrum analyzer
 Mini-Player view
 Internet radio tuner with 200+ built-in presets
 Podcast download and organization

AtomicPlayer 

QuuxPlayer has recently been revised and re-released under new branding called AtomicPlayer. AtomicPlayer is similar in structure but has been rewritten to support the newest Windows audio stack, called WASAPI (Windows Audio Session API). AtomicPlayer requires Windows Vista or Windows 7 because this new audio infrastructure is offered in those versions. QuuxPlayer remains available as a legacy offering to support Windows XP and for ASIO support.

External links 
 Official page
 Editor's review, CNET
 Editor's review PC World
 Windows 7 Download Review
 Download Softpedia 

Windows media players
Windows-only freeware
Tag editors